Somphong's puffer, redeye puffer or crested puffer (Carinotetraodon lorteti) is a small freshwater blowfish found in mainlands Southeast Asia such as Thailand, Cambodia, Vietnam. This fish has been collected in the past for the aquarium trade.

This species  is often found in canal and brackish water along the coast of Southeast Asia. For example, in Thailand, it is often found hidden in dense water hyacinths in the canal of Bangkok's Thonburi, but it is a rare species. The male has a red body with red eyes like ruby and is significantly larger than the female. The size when matured about 3 in (about 7 cm).

Its common name (include specific name which once used) honours Thai fish explorer and aquarium trader Somphong Lek-aree, who discovered three new freshwater fish species in the world viz dwarf loach (Ambastaia sidthimunki), Discherodontus halei (formerly Puntius somphongsi) and Somphongs's rasbora  (Trigonostigma somphongsi).

References

External links
 

Carinotetraodon
Fishkeeping
Fish described in 1885
Fish of Thailand
Fish of Cambodia
Fish of Vietnam
Taxa named by Gilbert Tirant